Fasten Your Seatbelts is a 2014 Italian comedy-drama film written and directed by Ferzan Özpetek. For their performances in this film  Kasia Smutniak and Paola Minaccioni won the Nastro d'Argento Awards for best actress and best supporting actress respectively.

Cast 
 Kasia Smutniak as Elena
 Francesco Arca as Antonio
 Filippo Scicchitano as Fabio
 Carolina Crescentini as Silvia
 Francesco Scianna as Giorgio
 Carla Signoris as Anna
 Elena Sofia Ricci as Viviana / Dora
 Paola Minaccioni as Egle Santini
 Giulia Michelini as Diana
 Luisa Ranieri as Maricla

References

External links 

2014 films
2014 comedy-drama films
Films directed by Ferzan Özpetek
Italian comedy-drama films
2010s Italian films